Niclas Molinder (full name Niclas Aake Molinder) is a Swedish songwriter, producer, music publisher and engineer, entrepreneur and one of the founders of Auddly, a venture between Niclas Molinder, Joacim Persson, Max Martin and Björn Ulvaeus from ABBA.

References

External links
Facebook
Discogs

Swedish songwriters
Swedish record producers
Living people
Year of birth missing (living people)